The European Parliament election of 2019 took place in Italy on 26 May 2019.

In Sardinia the League, which included the Sardinian Action Party, came first with 27.7% of the vote (country-level result 34.3%), slightly ahead of the Five Star Movement (25.7%) and the Democratic Party (24.3%). Forza Italia came a distant fourth (7.8%), ahead of Brothers of Italy (6.2%), The Left (2.2%), More Europe (2.1%) and Green Europe (1.6%). No Sardinian candidate was elected to the European Parliament, due to the strength of Sicilians in the Islands constituency.

Results

References

Elections in Sardinia
European Parliament elections in Italy
2019 European Parliament election
2019 elections in Italy